William Earl Dodge is an outdoor bronze sculpture of William E. Dodge by John Quincy Adams Ward, located at Bryant Park in Manhattan, New York. It was cast in 1885 and dedicated on October 22 of that year.

History

The statue was initially installed in Herald Square, having been financed by Dodge's admirers and friends. It was moved to Bryant Park in 1941 and was renovated in 1992 by the Bryant Park Restoration Corporation. The pedestal on which it originally stood was replaced in the 1941 move.

References

External links
 
 From the Archives: William Earle Dodge in Bryant Park (November 19, 2010), Bryant Park Corporation

1885 establishments in New York (state)
1885 sculptures
Bronze sculptures in Manhattan
Bryant Park
Monuments and memorials in Manhattan
Outdoor sculptures in Manhattan
Sculptures of men in New York City
Statues in New York City